Hemsworth railway station served the town of Hemsworth, West Yorkshire, England from 1866 to 1967 on the West Riding and Grimsby Railway.

History 
The station opened on 1 February 1866 by the Great Northern Railway.  It closed to passengers and goods traffic on 6 November 1967.

References

External links 

Disused railway stations in Wakefield
Former West Riding and Grimsby Railway stations
Railway stations in Great Britain opened in 1866
Railway stations in Great Britain closed in 1967
1866 establishments in England
1967 disestablishments in England
Beeching closures in England
Hemsworth